Jackie Pilkington (born in New York City),  known as Irish Jackie Pilkington, was a professional boxer in the Lightweight division.

Background 

Pilkington was born in New York City to Irish American parents. After the death of his widowed mother in 1919, his older brother Charlie Pilkington moved the entire family to Meriden, Connecticut. Jackie started boxing there in 1924 at the West Side Athletic Club after his brother had left to box in Australia.

Professional career

During his career, Pilkington actively boxed in the New York City, Hartford, and New Haven boxing circuits.

Shortly after Jackie began boxing in the professional leagues, his older brother brought him to box in Australia, where he fought five bouts in 1927.

In 1930, Pilkington boxed for the Connecticut state title against Bobby Mays in a match set up by the famous manager Al Weill, losing the match at the Thames Arena in New London.

In 1931, Pilkington fought his brother's forming sparring partner, featherweight champion Kid Kaplan in Hartford for the New England Lightweight Championship, losing the match to Kaplan in a 10 round match.

Over the course of his career, Pilkington fought Benny Bass, Billy Wallace, Georgie Day, and Johnny Dundee - who Pilkington beat in a 10 round match.

See also
List of people from Harlem

References

American people of Irish descent
Lightweight boxers
Boxers from New York City
American male boxers